1927 in Argentine football saw both leagues reunified under the name "Asociación Amateurs Argentina de Football". The championship was won by San Lorenzo obtaining its 3rd. title.

Sportivo Barracas returned to Primera División, while Sportivo Almagro changed its name to "Almagro".

Primera División

Lower divisions

Primera B
Champion: El Porvenir (promoted to Primera along with Argentino de Banfield

Primera C
Champion: Unión de Caseros

International cups

Copa Dr. Ricardo Aldao
Champion: San Lorenzo

Final

Argentina national team
Argentina won its 3rd. Copa América title, tournament held by Perú.

The national team also won the Copa Newton defeating Uruguay 1-0 at Montevideo.

References

 
Seasons in Argentine football
Argentine